Kriel Power Station in Mpumalanga, South Africa, is a coal-fired power plant operated by Eskom. It is located about 4 km from Matla Power Station just outside the town of Kriel (Emalahleni Local Municipality, Mpumalanga).

In contrast with most other Eskom power stations, the turbine generators at Kriel are each housed in a separate building rather than the more common single turbine hall.

When Kriel was completed in 1979 it was the largest coal-fired power station in the Southern Hemisphere. It was also one of the first stations to be supplied with coal from a fully mechanised coal mine.

History 
On 25 July 2022, the entire power station tripped. Eskom said the first fault caused units 1, 2 and 3 of the power station to trip, while the second fault tripped units 4 and 5. Unit 6 was already offline.

Power generation
The station has six 500MW units for a total installed capacity of 3,000MW with turbine Maximum Continuous Rating at 36.90%.

See also 

 Fossil-fuel power plant
 List of power stations in South Africa

References

External links
 Kriel Power Station on the Eskom website

Coal-fired power stations in South Africa
Towers in South Africa
Buildings and structures in Mpumalanga
Economy of Mpumalanga
Emalahleni Local Municipality, Mpumalanga